Michael Batiste (born December 24, 1970) is a former American football defensive tackle and offensive guard in the National Football League (NFL) for the Dallas Cowboys and Washington Redskins. He also was a member of the Frankfurt Galaxy and Barcelona Dragons in the World League of American Football. He played college football at Tulane University.

Early years
Michael Batiste attended West Brook Senior High School, where he was an All-district selection in football as a senior (jersey 72). He also lettered in basketball and track as a 3 year letter-man.

He accepted a football scholarship from Tulane University in New Orleans, LA. He became a starter at defensive tackle (number 54) as a sophomore, posting 57 tackles (6 for loss) and 3 sacks. The next year, he started 9 games at defensive tackle, posting 42 tackles (5 for loss) and 4 sacks. As a senior he started 10 games, registering 40 tackles (3 for loss) and one sack, while playing left defensive end and defensive tackle.

Professional career

Dallas Cowboys
Michael Batiste was signed as an undrafted free agent by the Dallas Cowboys after the 1994 NFL Draft, to play defensive tackle. He was waived on August 23.

In 1995, he was re-signed and converted into an offensive guard during training camp. He switched back to play in 2 regular season games as a backup defensive lineman. He was a part of the Super Bowl XXX winning team.

In 1996, he was allocated to the Frankfurt Galaxy of the World League of American Football, to play on the offensive line. Although he could run block, he struggled in pass protection and was released on August 25.

Washington Redskins
On February 26, 1997, he was signed as a free agent by the Washington Redskins. He was cut on August 24.

After being out of football for a year working as a substitute teacher at Northwestern High School, he was signed as a free agent on February 11, 1998. He played mainly on special teams and briefly as an offensive guard against the Denver Broncos and Minnesota Vikings. He was released on October 20.

Barcelona Dragons
In 1999, Michael Batiste played for the Barcelona Dragons of NFL Europe.

References

1970 births
Living people
People from Beaumont, Texas
Players of American football from Texas
American football offensive guards
American football defensive tackles
Tulane Green Wave football players
Dallas Cowboys players
Washington Redskins players
Frankfurt Galaxy players
Barcelona Dragons players